The 1957 Penn State Nittany Lions baseball team represented the Pennsylvania State University in the 1957 NCAA University Division baseball season. The team was coached by Joe Bedenk in his 27th season at Penn State.

The Nittany Lions lost the College World Series, defeated by the California Golden Bears in the championship game.

Roster

Schedule 

! style="" | Regular Season
|- valign="top" 

|- align="center" bgcolor="#ccffcc" 
| April 10 ||  || Unknown • State College, PA || 15–1 || 1–0
|- align="center" bgcolor="#ccffcc" 
| April 13 ||  || Unknown • State College, PA || 14–2 || 2–0
|- align="center" bgcolor="#ccffcc" 
| April 16 ||  || Unknown • State College, PA || 14–2 || 3–0
|- align="center" bgcolor="#ccffcc" 
| April 19 || at  || Unknown • Gettysburg, PA || 13–2 || 4–0
|- align="center" bgcolor="#ccffcc" 
| April 20 || at  || Unknown • Easton, PA || 2–1 || 5–0
|- align="center" bgcolor="#ccffcc" 
| April 27 ||  || Unknown • State College, PA || 12–0 || 6–0
|- align="center" bgcolor="#ccffcc" 
| April 27 || Georgetown || Unknown • State College, PA || 2–1 || 7–0
|-

|- align="center" bgcolor="#ccffcc" 
| May 1 ||  || Unknown • State College, PA || 11–2 || 8–0
|- align="center" bgcolor="#ccffcc" 
| May 3 ||  || Unknown • State College, PA || 9–7 || 9–0
|- align="center" bgcolor="#ccffcc" 
| May 4 || at  || Doubleday Field • West Point, NY || 16–7 || 10–0
|- align="center" bgcolor="#ccffcc" 
| May 7 || at  || Unknown • Annapolis, MD || 8–5 || 11–0
|- align="center" bgcolor="#ccffcc" 
| May 15 ||  || Unknown • State College, PA || 10–5 || 12–0
|- align="center" bgcolor="#ccffcc" 
| May 18 || at  || Unknown • Morgantown, WV || 6–0 || 13–0
|- align="center" bgcolor="#ccffcc" 
| May 21 || at  || Erny Field • Philadelphia, PA || 10–2 || 14–0
|- align="center" bgcolor="#ccffcc" 
| May 22 || at Bucknell || Unknown • Lewisburg, PA || 14–0 || 15–0
|- align="center" bgcolor="#ccffcc" 
| May 27 ||  || Unknown • State College, PA || 16–3 || 16–0
|- align="center" bgcolor="#ccffcc" 
| May 27 || Pittsburgh || Unknown • State College, PA || 7–4 || 17–0
|-

|-
! style="" | Postseason
|-

|- align="center" bgcolor="#ccffcc" 
| May 30 || vs  || Ebbets Field • New York, NY || 2–1 || 18–0
|- align="center" bgcolor="#ccffcc" 
| May 31 || vs  || Ebbets Field • New York, NY || 5–0 || 19–0
|-

|- align="center" bgcolor="#ccffcc" 
| June 8 || vs Florida State || Johnny Rosenblatt Stadium • Omaha, NE || 6–0 || 20–0
|- align="center" bgcolor="#ccffcc" 
| June 9 || vs Texas || Johnny Rosenblatt Stadium • Omaha, NE || 4–1 || 21–0
|- align="center" bgcolor="#ffcccc" 
| June 10 || vs California || Johnny Rosenblatt Stadium • Omaha, NE || 0–8 || 21–1
|- align="center" bgcolor="#ccffcc" 
| June 11 || vs Notre Dame || Johnny Rosenblatt Stadium • Omaha, NE || 5–4 || 22–1
|- align="center" bgcolor="#ffcccc" 
| June 12 || vs California || Johnny Rosenblatt Stadium • Omaha, NE || 0–1 || 22–2
|-

Awards and honors 
Cal Emery
 College World Series Most Outstanding Player

Ed Drapcho
 First Team All-American

References 

Penn State Nittany Lions baseball seasons
College World Series seasons
Penn State Nittany Lions
Penn State